Albion was launched at Fort Gloucester, Calcutta, India, in 1814. She wrecked on 13 January 1817 off Trincomalee, while on her way from Madras to London. Her crew and passengers were rescued.

 assisted in the rescue efforts. The officers of the Madras Establishment awarded Captain John Brett Purvis a silver plate worth £100 in recognition of his efforts.

Citations

References
 
 
 

1814 ships
British ships built in India
Maritime incidents in 1817